Keelville is an unincorporated community in Cherokee County, Kansas, United States.

History
A post office was established in Keelville in 1868, and remained in operation until it was discontinued in 1905.

References

Further reading

External links
 Cherokee County maps: Current, Historic, KDOT

Unincorporated communities in Cherokee County, Kansas
Unincorporated communities in Kansas